Pangili is a tiny and remote village in Rapur Taluk of Nellore District of Andhra Pradesh in India.

References

Villages in Nellore district